AsapScience, stylized as AsapSCIENCE, is a YouTube channel created by Canadian YouTubers Mitchell Moffit and Gregory Brown. The channel produces weekly videos that touch on many different topics of science.

AsapScience is one of the largest educational channels on YouTube. Some of the songs they have created include The Digits Of Pi and The Periodic Table Song.

Team

 Mitchell "Mitch" Moffit, born , creator and host
 Gregory "Greg" Brown, born , creator and host

Moffit and Brown are an openly gay couple who met while studying biology at the University of Guelph. They made their sexualities and relationship public online in 2014, two years after starting their channel, in response to derogatory comments and in order to be visible role models for young gay people interested in science.

 Kendra Y. Hill, manager
 Max Simmons, illustrator
 Luka Sarlija, editor

Channel
AsapScience videos are about science, with many episodes, such as How Much Sleep Do You Actually Need?, discussing functions of the human body. They sometimes make songs explaining science such as Science Love Song and Periodic Table Song. Each video's scientific concepts are conveyed using coloured drawings on a whiteboard and voice-over narration. As revealed in a behind-the-scenes video, Mitchell voices and composes the background music for the videos, while Greg is the primary illustrator.

The most viewed video of the channel currently is Do You Hear "Yanny" or "Laurel"?, which has 64 million views. Their videos have been featured in websites such as The Huffington Post and Gizmodo.

In March 2015, Moffit and Brown released their first book, AsapSCIENCE: Answers to the World's Weirdest Questions, Most Persistent Rumors, and Unexplained Phenomena.

Collaborations
AsapScience has collaborated with Vsauce3 on 4 videos, The Scientific Secret of Strength and Muscle Growth and What if Superman Punched You?, Can We Genetically Improve Intelligence? and Can You Genetically Enhance Yourself?.

One of the videos, Could We Stop An Asteroid?, features Bill Nye, who discusses different ways humanity could stop an asteroid if one were on a collision course for Earth.

On February 2, 2014, AsapScience announced that they have collaborated with CBC News to produce one video daily related to sports, for 19 days starting from 6 February.

AsapScience also appeared in several videos with IISuperwomanII.

They had a one-time collaboration with Kurzgesagt – In a Nutshell on the What Is The Most Dangerous Drug In The World? video which aired on November 16, 2017.

In December 2017, AsapScience appeared on Rhett and Link's YouTube channel Good Mythical Morning.

In 2020, alongside Psych IRL and others, AsapScience featured in a YouTube original series Sleeping With Friends, a competition in which participants aim to get the best night's sleep.

Religion
On March 16, 2017, AsapScience released a video regarding the existence of God and whether it could be proven through the use of math, titled "Can Math Prove God's Existence?" The video sparked a lot of controversy and received a channel-highest dislike percentage of more than 45%.

Statistics
As of 26 June 2022, AsapScience and Greg and Mitch have over 11 million subscribers combined.

Other work

In February 2016, Mitch was announced as one of the 16 HouseGuests on Big Brother Canada 4. He placed 11th and was evicted on day 42 in a 5-3 eviction vote. He was the first member of the Final Jury that decided the winner of the game.

See also
Vsauce
Veritasium
MinutePhysics
Numberphile
Kurzgesagt – In a Nutshell
Vi Hart
Wendover Productions
Mark Rober

References

Science-related YouTube channels
Science communicators
LGBT YouTubers